Five Little Ducks is a traditional children's song. The rhyme also has an associated finger play. Canadian children's folk singer Raffi released it as a single from the Rise and Shine album. Denise Fleming's 2016 picture book 5 Little Ducks tells a reimagined version of the song.

Lyrics and music
Like all folk songs, the exact wording varies. A common variant is:

Five little ducks went out one day,
Over the hills and far away.
Mummy duck said, "quack quack quack quack,"
But only four little ducks came back.

Four little ducks went out one day,
Over the hills and far away.
Mummy  duck said, "quack quack quack quack,"
But only three little ducks came back.

Three little ducks went out one day,
Over the hills and far away.
Mummy duck said, "quack quack quack quack,"
But only two little ducks came back.

Two little ducks went out one day,
Over the hills and far away.
Mummy  duck said, "quack quack quack quack,"
But only one little duck came back.

One little duck went out one day,
Over the hills and far away.
Mummy  duck said, "quack quack quack quack,"
And all of the five little ducks came back.
Hold up five fingers
Wave hand as if going up and down a hill
Make opening and closing motion with hand, as if a beak
Hold up four fingers

Repeat actions,
using the corresponding number of fingers
as the numbers count down.

Music

Translations
German: "Fünf kleine Enten"
French: "Cinq petits canards"
Italian: "Cinque paperelle"
Portuguese: "Cinco patinhos"
Spanish: "Cinco patitos"

See also
 List of playground songs

References

English nursery rhymes
Finger plays
Playground songs
English children's songs
English folk songs
Traditional children's songs
Fictional ducks
Fictional quintets